Schwarmstedt is a Samtgemeinde ("collective municipality") in the district of Heidekreis, in Lower Saxony, Germany. Its seat is in the village Schwarmstedt.

The Samtgemeinde Schwarmstedt consists of the following municipalities:

 Buchholz 
 Essel 
 Gilten 
 Lindwedel 
 Schwarmstedt

Samtgemeinden in Lower Saxony
Heidekreis